Qarah Daraq-e Olya-ye Do (also Romanized as Qarah Daraq-e ‘Olyā-ye Do) is a village in Abish Ahmad Rural District, Abish Ahmad District, Kaleybar County, East Azerbaijan Province, Iran. At the 2006 census, its population was 26, in 4 families.

References 

Populated places in Kaleybar County